Sir George Adlington Syme KBE (13 July 1859 – 19 April 1929) was an Australian surgeon.

Early life and education
Syme was born at Nottingham, England, and was educated at Wesley College, Melbourne. His father, George Alexander Syme (1821–1894), a brother of David Syme and Ebenezer Syme, was a graduate of the University of Aberdeen and became a Baptist clergyman in England. On account of failing health he followed his brother, David, to Australia in 1862 and joined the staff of The Age. He became editor of the Leader from which he retired in 1885 and died on 31 December 1894. His son did a brilliant course at Melbourne University, graduating in 1881 with first-class honours in surgery, medicine and forensic medicine.

He continued his studies at King's College London, worked under Lister and gained his F.R.C.S. Eng. in 1885.

Career
He returned to Melbourne and became examiner in anatomy, and physiology at the university. In 1888 he qualified for the degree of Ch. M. and in 1890 was acting Professor of Anatomy. In 1893 he became Honorary Surgeon to in-patients at St Vincent's hospital, and held the same position at Melbourne Hospital from 1903 to 1919. When war broke out he left Australia in December 1914 as lieutenant-colonel, and was chief of the surgical staff in No. 1 general hospital at Cairo. He was present at the landing at Gallipoli. Invalided to England, he was consulting surgeon to the Australian Imperial Forces in London.

He returned to Australia in 1916 and was attached to the Caulfield Military Hospital as surgeon. Syme was President of the Australian Medical Congress in 1923, and three times President of the Victorian branch of the British Medical Association. During the last two years of his life he was much interested in the formation of the Australasian College of Surgeons, of which he was the first president. On his retirement in 1924 he was presented with his portrait painted by Sir John Longstaff and subscribed for by members of his profession. In the same year he was created KBE.

He died on 19 April 1929. He married Mabel Berry, who survived him with one son and three daughters. His portrait by Longstaff is in the Medical Society hall at Melbourne.

External links
Sir George Adlington Syme (1859–1929) Gravesite at Brighton General Cemetery (Vic)

References

1859 births
1929 deaths
English emigrants to Australia
Melbourne Medical School alumni
Alumni of King's College London
Australian surgeons
Australian Knights Commander of the Order of the British Empire
Australian Baptists
People educated at Wesley College (Victoria)
19th-century Baptists